The following outline is provided as an overview of and topical guide to Saturn:

Saturn – sixth planet from the Sun and the second-largest in the Solar System, after Jupiter. It is a gas giant with an average radius about nine times that of Earth. Although only one-eighth the average density of Earth, with its larger volume Saturn is just over 95 times more massive. Saturn is named after the Roman god of agriculture; its astronomical symbol (♄) represents the god's sickle.

Classification of Saturn 

 Astronomical object
 Gravitationally rounded object
 Planet
 Giant planet
 Gas giant
 Planet of the Solar System
 Outer planet
 Superior planet

Location of Saturn 

 Milky Way Galaxy – barred spiral galaxy
 Orion Arm – a spiral arm of the Milky Way
 Solar System – the Sun and the objects that orbit it, including 8 planets, the sixth planet from the Sun being Saturn
 Orbit of Saturn

Movement of Saturn 

 Orbit of Saturn
 Rotation of Saturn

Features of Saturn 

 Great White Spot
 Magnetosphere of Saturn
 Rings
 Dragon Storm

Natural satellites of Saturn 

 Moons of Saturn

Ring moonlets of Saturn 

 S/2009 S 1
 Pan
 Daphnis
 Atlas
 Prometheus
 Pandora
 Aegaeon

Co-orbital moons of Saturn 
 Janus
 Epimetheus

Inner large moons of Saturn 

 Mimas
 Geological features on Mimas
 Enceladus
 Tiger Stripes on Enceladus
 Geological features on Enceladus
 Quadrangles on Enceladus
 Tethys
 Geological features on Tethys
 Quadrangles on Tethys
 Dione
 Geological features on Dione
 Quadrangles on Dione

Alkyonides group of moons of Saturn 

 Methone
 Anthe
 Pallene

Trojan moons of Saturn 

 Telesto
 Calypso
 Helene
 Polydeuces

Outer large moons of Saturn 

 Rhea
 Rings of Rhea
 Geological features on Rhea
 Quadrangles on Rhea
 Titan
 Atmosphere of Titan
 Lakes of Titan
 Life on Titan
 Geological features on Titan
 Hyperion
 Geological features on Hyperion
 Iapetus
 Geological features on Iapetus

Inuit group of moons of Saturn 

Saturn's Inuit group of satellites
 Kiviuq
 Ijiraq
 Paaliaq
 Siarnaq
 Tarqeq

Gallic group of moons of Saturn 

Saturn's Gallic group of satellites
 Albiorix
 Bebhionn
 Erriapus
 Tarvos

Norse group of Saturn satellites 

Saturn's Norse group of satellites
 Skoll
 S/2004 S 13
 Greip
 Hyrrokkin
 Jarnsaxa
 Mundilfari
 S/2006 S 1
 S/2004 S 17
 Bergelmir
 Narvi
 Suttungr
 Hati
 S/2004 S 12
 Farbauti
 Thrymr
 Aegir
 S/2007 S 3
 Bestla
 S/2004 S 7
 S/2006 S 3
 Fenrir
 Surtur
 Kari
 Ymir
 Loge
 Fornjot

History of Saturn 

History of Saturn

Exploration of Saturn 

Exploration of Saturn

Flyby missions to explore Saturn 

 Pioneer 11
 Voyager program
 Voyager 1
 Voyager 2

Direct missions to explore Saturn 

 Cassini–Huygens
 Huygens

Proposed missions to explore Saturn 

 Titan Saturn System Mission
 Titan Mare Explorer

See also 

 Outline of astronomy
 Outline of the Solar System
 Outline of space exploration

References

External links 

 Saturn profile at NASA's Solar System Exploration site
 Saturn Fact Sheet, by NASA
 Gazeteer of Planetary Nomenclature – Saturn (USGS)
 Cassini–Huygens mission to Saturn, by NASA
 Research News about Saturn
 General information about Saturn
 Studies on the Rings of Saturn
 Astronomy Cast: Saturn
 Saturn in Daytime (12 inch telescope)
 Saturn 'Rev 175' Raw Preview
 
 BBC In Our Time radio program

Saturn
Saturn